A crouton is a piece of sautéed or rebaked bread, often cubed and seasoned, that is used to add texture and flavor to salads, as an accompaniment to soups, or eaten as a snack food.

Crouton may also refer to:

 Crouton (computing), a set of scripts for use in ChromeOS
 Crouton (singer), Jacob "Crouton" Olds, a singer in the band Family Force 5
 Crouton Records, a former record label started by Jon Mueller
 "Walter Crouton", a comic strip published by Seth MacFarlane
 Crouton, a planet featured in the show They Came from Outer Space

See also 
 Croton (disambiguation)